Decree No. 493 "On citizens of Tatar nationality, formerly living in the Crimea" was issued by the Presidium of the Supreme Soviet on 5 September 1967 to placate and confuse the Crimean Tatar civil rights movement. Issued shortly after Crimean Tatar rights activists met with senior government officials to outline their grievances and demands for full rehabilitation, right of return, reparations, and restoration of the Crimean ASSR, the decree conceded to none of those demands but did normalize the government's euphemism "citizen of Tatar nationality formerly living in the Crimea" in lieu of the proper ethnonym of Crimean Tatar as per the policy of not acknowledging Crimean Tatars to be a distinct ethnic group as well as give the government a way of claiming that the issue was "solved". While other deported peoples such as the Chechens, Ingush, Kalmyks, Karachays, and Balkars had long since been permitted to return to their native lands and their republics were restored in addition to other forms of political rehabilitation as recognized peoples, the very same decree that rehabilitated those peoples in 1956 took on a genocidal tone towards internally deported Crimean Tatars, urging "national reunification" in the Tatar ASSR belonging to the distinct but similarly named Volga Tatars in lieu of restoration of the Crimean ASSR for Crimean Tatars who sought a national republic. While the 1956 decree and other internal government documents had long been using euphemisms in lieu of the term "Crimean Tatar", few Crimean Tatars were aware of the practice until seeing the decree proclaiming they were "rehabilitated" yet "firmly rooted" in current places of residence and bound to the then-current passport regime published in newspapers in September 1967. Nevertheless, several thousand Crimean Tatars attempted to return to Crimea upon seeing the decree and getting the mistaken impression that it meant they would be allowed to register in Crimea unhindered, much to their shock upon arrival that the propiska offices in Crimea continued to blatantly discriminate against Crimean Tatars, resulting in their redeportation. 

Hero of the Soviet Union Abdraim Reshidov was among the first Crimean Tatars who tried to return to Crimea upon seeing the decree published in the central newspapers, but unlike many others he was able to get a residence permit, albeit only after resorting to threatening self-immolation.

The decree was widely rebuked by people in the Crimean Tatar civil rights movement as being a "fraud", "Another step towards the elimination of the Crimean Tatar people as a nation", and was ridiculed by the Tashkent Ten defendants as a pseudo-rehabilitation.

References

Politics of the Crimean Tatars
Government documents of the Soviet Union
Soviet decrees
1967 documents